The Durg–Jammu Tawi Superfast Express is a Superfast train belonging to South East Central Railway zone that runs between  and  in India. It is currently being operated with 12549/12550 train numbers on a weekly basis.

Service

The 12550/Jammu Tawi–Durg Weekly Superfast Express has an average speed of 56 km/hr and covers 1873 km in 33 h 10 m.

Route and halts 

The important halts of the train are:

Coach composition

The train has standard LHB rakes with a max speed of 160 kmph. The train consists of 24 coaches :

 0.5 First AC 
 2.5 AC II Tier
 4 AC III Tier
 9 Sleeper coaches
 1 Pantry car
 3 General Unreserved
 2 Seating cum Luggage Rake
As it shares its rake with 12834 Durg–Hazrat Nizamuddin Chhattisgarh Sampark Kranti, it has been replaced with LHB coach.

Traction

Both trains are hauled by a Tuglakabad-based WAP-7 locomotive from Jammu to Bilaspur, from Bilaspur to Durg both trains are hauled by a Bhilai-based WAP-7 locomotive and vice versa.

Rake sharing 

The train shares its rake with 12823/12824 Chhattisgarh Sampark Kranti Superfast Express.

Direction reversal

The train reverses its direction once:

Notes

See also 

 Durg Junction railway station
 Jammu Tawi railway station
 Durg–Jammu Tawi Express
 Chhattisgarh Sampark Kranti Superfast Express

References

External links 

 12549/Durg–Jammu Tawi SF Express
 12550/Jammu Tawi–Durg Weekly SF Express

Transport in Durg
Transport in Jammu
Express trains in India
Rail transport in Chhattisgarh
Rail transport in Madhya Pradesh
Rail transport in Uttar Pradesh
Rail transport in Delhi
Rail transport in Haryana
Rail transport in Punjab, India
Rail transport in Jammu and Kashmir
Railway services introduced in 2010